Untold: The Rise and Fall of AND1 is a 2022 American Netflix original documentary film directed by Kevin Wilson Jr.  The film is the seventh installment in the nine-part Untold documentary film series. Its story follows the rise and fall of the American sportswear brand AND1. It was released on August 23, 2022.

Cast
 Seth Berger
 Jay Coen Gilbert
 Tom Austin
 Grayson Boucher
 Philip Champion
 Waliyy Dixon
 Shane Woney
 Rafer Alston
 Stephon Marbury

References

External links 
 
 
 Official trailer

2022 films
2022 documentary films
American sports documentary films
2020s English-language films
English-language Netflix original films
2020s American films
Netflix original documentary films